Ram Shah (reign before 16061636) was the king of the Gorkha Kingdom (present-day Gorkha District, Nepal). He was the son of King of Gorkha Purna Shah and brother of Chatra Shah. He acceded in the throne in c. 1606 after his brother's death. He expanded his kingdom far as the Trishuli River (east), the Marshyangdi (west), the Rasuwa, (north) and the Mahabharat Range (west).

Shah was known as the "great conqueror" and "conscientious". He brought many changes to the Kingdom of Gorkha, including fixed and uniform weights and measurements, criminal codes, created a fixed rate of interest and built the Newar architecture palace Gorkha Palace. His statue is displayed at his Chautari where he used to give justice to the people.

Reign 
When the first ruler of Gorkha Dravya Shah's son Purna Shah acceded in the throne, he ruled for about thirty-five years. Upon his death, his son Chatra Shah became the King and ruled the kingdom for about seven months until his death, as he did not have any children his brother Ram Shah acceded in the throne in c. 1606. Shah was described as "great conqueror" and "conscientious". He wanted to expand his kingdom which only consisted of Liglig, Gorkha, Siranchok and Ajirgarh.

Gorkha was neighbours with small kingdoms ruled by the Gurungs, Bhotias and the Rajputs. Shah started to expand his army and created a friendship between the kings of Palpa, Jumla, and Lalitpur. King Narsingh Malla of Lalitpur, sent 24 merchants to live in Gorkha. In 1620, Ngawang Namgyal signed a friendship treaty with Shah; which allowed 50 people from the kingdom to live in Bhutan.

He began to colonise Barpak, Shyartan, Atharsaya Khola, Ferung, Khari, Meghi Charage, Niwarchok, Dhading; his conquest led the size of the kingdom far as the Trishuli River (east), the Marshyangdi (west), the Rasuwa, (north) and the Mahabharat Range (west). Fearing the rapid expansion of Gorkha, the Lamjung kings invaded the kingdom; which was unsuccessful and led them to withdraw their troops beyond Marshyandi. During the expansion, Kaji Ganesh Pandey led the army against Ghale Raja of Sallayan, in which the Kaji died in the combat. Shah was furious and ordered the soldiers to go back "for running from the field of battle and ordered them to go back to redeem their hounour, which they finally did". Ghale Raja was defeated and killed by a sword.

During his reign, there were not any "fixed and uniform weights and measures" which varied from location to location; in order to fix this, he brought standard weights and measures throughout the kingdom. Shah created a fixed rate of interest, money lenders were not able to charge more than 10% interest and if it was in the form of PIK loan not more than 25% interest. Though, if not paid within 10 years, the moneylenders were able to raise the amount double or triple if it was in PIK loan.

He created an agreement "for grazing grounds for the cattle in each and every village" and those who claimed them would be "severely dealt with"; punishment also extended to the people who cut down trees near a road. Shah introduced many titles including Kaji, Sardar, and Khardar. He introduced criminal codes; that created a saying around the kingdom "Nyaya napaye Gorkha janu (translation: If you don't get justice, go to Gorkha)”. He would "dispense justice and display fairness". During his reign, the Gorkha Palace, Newar architecture palace was built circa 1610; it was destroyed by the April 2015 Nepal earthquake.

Personal life and legacy 

The birth date of Ram Shah is unknown; he was the brother of Chatra Shah. He was born to Purna Shah. Ram Shah asked King of Bhutan to send Lamas "to perform [the] rite for the peace in his family and for the birth of a son". They were successful; he had three sons including Dambar Shah. He followed the religion Hinduism. It was believed that he ruled the kingdom for about 27 years until his death in 1633; however, newly discovered information indicated he was ruling in 1636. So it was concluded that ruled until 1636. Upon his death, his wife committed sati or "burn[ed] on the funeral pyre with her husband".

In Gorkha, there is a statue of Ram Shah in Ram Shah's Chautari, where he used to provide justice to the people. His criminal code was used by his successors, including the last king of Gorkha and the first king of Nepal Prithvi Narayan Shah. It is said that wife of Shah possessed the power of the Devi, following the death of her, and revolutionary Lakhan Thapa, someone built a Manakamana Temple. He was noted for his justice system.

References

1636 deaths
Gurkhas
Shah dynasty
People from Gorkha District
17th-century Nepalese people
Nepalese Hindus
National heroes of Nepal